Kuntilanak (english title: "The Chanting") is a 2006 Indonesian horror film directed by Rizal Mantovani, (although this is not a direct translation as Kuntilanak or Pontianak) about a ghost type in Indonesian (and wider Malay) folklore. In this movie, a student whose step-father molested her moves to a boarding house in a haunted area, this is followed by a series of killings.

Plot 
Samantha "Sam" is an orphaned young woman who moves to an isolated boarding house in North Jakarta, trying to avoid the advances of her pervert stepfather. The landlady of the house, Yanti, tells her that the house was previously a batik factory of the Mangkoedjiwo family, with its current leader, Raden Ayu Sri Sukmarahimi Mangkoedjiwo having lent the house under a condition that the second floor is locked up with no one allowed inside. While listing other restrictions, including about a chair in front of a Javanese mirror in Sam's room, Yanti chants durmo, a Javanese poem said to be able to summon Kuntilanak, a female ghost with half the body of a horse rumored to be living in a weeping fig in front of the house. Meanwhile, Sam mentions her recurring nightmares of a woman in a fire with a Kuntilanak to her boyfriend, Agung. Agung learns from his eccentric friend, Iwank, and his mother that the Mangkoedjiwo is long rumored to be a black magic sect maintaining a Kuntilanak, itself can only be summoned by antique objects. At the house, Sam befriends Dinda, who tells her that there are actually three other mirrors identical to the one in Sam's room: two of which are in herself and Ratih's rooms. 

One day, Sam breaks the rule about the mirror, glimpsing a Kuntilanak in the process. Her neighbor, Mawar, who is with her boyfriend (when males are forbidden to step on the third floor), threatens to kill Sam, but Sam suddenly enters a trance and chants durmo, making her puke maggots and materialize a strange scar as well as causing Mawar to have nosebleed. At a motel, Mawar is killed when an electric fan drops on her neck. The next night, Sam tries to peek on the second floor, but is harassed by a neighbor, Alfon. She enters into a trance and chants durmo again. Haunted by terrifying apparitions, Alfon tries to escape but is killed in a car accident. In the light of recent events, Sri Sukma pays visit to the house. Yanti apologizes for her foolish act in introducing durmo to Sam, although Sri Sukma says that it is her destiny to keep it. While reading a book about Mangkoedjiwo factory in Iwank's house, Sam spots the sentence Sing kuat sing melihara ("the strong one is the one that masters Kuntilanak"). During a conflict with Agung, Sam chants durmo; the next day, she learns Agung has disappeared. She hears Agung's faint cries from the second floor. Sam discusses Agung's disappearance with Dinda, but misunderstands Dinda's comfort as her being attracted to Agung. Chanting durmo, Sam passes out when Dinda goes out to take a shower where she is killed by Kuntilanak. 

Having had enough, Sam breaks over to the second floor and finds Agung bleeding in front of the fourth mirror Dinda previously forgot to mention. She is confronted by Sri Sukma, who explains that the Mangkoedjiwo does indeed maintain a Kuntilanak summoned by a wangsit (a supernatural mandate) kept by their heirs, but since Sri Sukma is unable to bear children, she has chosen Sam as the next carrier of the wangsit. When Sam refuses, Sri Sukma chants durmo to summon Kuntilanak, though Sam counters with her own durmo, eventually winning out when Sri Sukma has nosebleed. Pleading Sam not to kill her, Sri Sukma says that the Kuntilanak can be stopped by removing its entrance to the living world; by breaking all mirrors. Sam manages to break the mirrors in her, Dinda, and Ratih's rooms, but forgets the one in the second floor long enough before Kuntilanak kills Sri Sukma. Two ghost children appear to take Sam, who manages to break free, only to be cornered by Kuntilanak. However, she continuously chants Sing kuat sing melihara until the Kuntilanak obeys and goes back to the mirror. The next day, Sam decides to keep the mirror so she could use it for her own deeds, disturbing Agung. She happily chants durmo as apparitions of Kuntilanak come out of the mirror.

Cast 
 Julie Estelle as Samantha  
 Evan Sanders as Agung  
 Ratu Felisha as Dinda 
 Alice Iskak as R.Ay, Sri Sukmarahimi Mangkoedjiwo 
 Lita Soewardi as Yanti 
 Ibnu Jamil as Iwank

Home media
The film received a DVD release in 2007.

Sequels 
The film is followed by two more sequels, Kuntilanak 2 and Kuntilanak 3, setting up a trilogy with Mantovani returning as director. Estelle reprised her role as the main protagonist for both films, while Sanders, Soewardi, Jamil, and Iskak only return for the first sequel. Bella Esperance, Cindy Valerie, Ida Iasha, and Piet Pagau additionally starred in Kuntilanak 2, which was released on 2007 and follows Sam as she struggles to maintain her sanity due to the wangsit of Kuntilanak while being hunted by remnants of the Mangkoedjiwo sect. The final film, Kuntilanak 3, was released on 2008 and starred Laudya Cynthia Bella, Imelda Therinne, Mandala Shoji, and Reza Pahlevi in addition to Estelle, Valerie, and Iasha. It follows Sam accompanied by a rescue group in tracking the origins of the wangsit of Kuntilanak on a remote forest highlands, hoping to destroy it once and for all.

A remake was released in 2018. Kuntilanak 2, a sequel of the remake, was released on June 4, 2019.

References

External links
 

2006 films
2006 horror films
Indonesian horror films
2000s Indonesian-language films
Films set in Indonesia
Indonesian ghost films
Films shot in Indonesia